Moreland Theater is a single-screen movie theater located in the Sellwood neighborhood of Portland, Oregon in the United States.

The theater was designed by Day Walter Hilborn or Thomas and Thomas (Oregon Public Broadcasting says the former, who designed other theaters in the region such as the Eltrym in Baker City, Oregon and Kiggins Theatre in Vancouver, Washington, while local archivists Gary Lacher and Steve Stone say the latter).

The theater opened on September 10, 1925 and initially hosted vaudeville acts and screened silent films. Moreland continues to screen first-run films.

Moreland remains one of Portland's few historic single-screen theaters. It has been included in walking tours of the Sellwood neighborhood.

The theater acquired its name from the geographic area once known as Moreland, named after local real estate developer Judge J.C. Moreland.

References

External links

 
 Moreland Theatre at Cinema Treasures
 Moreland Theatre at Puget Sound Theatre Organ Society

1925 establishments in Oregon
Cinemas and movie theaters in Oregon
Sellwood-Moreland, Portland, Oregon
Theatres completed in 1925
Theatres in Portland, Oregon